Jill Sebastian's Eclipse is located at Lake Bluff Terrace, Milwaukee, Wisconsin 2000. with stairs leading to it off the lakefront. It is a collaborative piece made out of vitreous glass and stone mosaic over concrete, bronze. The dimensions are 10’ x 10’ x 10'. Made in 2003, this sculpture is still in very good condition.

Artist information 

Jill Sebastian got her inspiration at a young age when she saw a woman painting a mural depicting labor strikes. She attended several colleges and got her MFA at UW Milwaukee in 1979. She is currently working on a project for the University of Wisconsin–Madison, building a new South Campus Union. She is also a professor of sculpture at the Milwaukee Institute of Art & Design (MIAD).

References

External links
Eclipse

Outdoor sculptures in Milwaukee
2003 sculptures
Glass works of art